Legalization of cannabis was considered in several U.S. states in 2020. States considered likely to legalize it for recreational use included Arizona, Florida, New Jersey, New Mexico, and New York.

At the beginning of 2020, 11 U.S. states had fully legalized cannabis, creating a "quasi post-Prohibition landscape" according to CNN. Politico reported that the number of states with some form of legalization could reach 40 by year's end.  This remained at odds with Federal prohibition at the beginning of the year (see List of Schedule I drugs (US)), although the House of Representatives held hearings in January on bills that could reschedule the substance or deschedule it entirely.

Cannabis legalization was ultimately approved via November ballot measures in four states: Arizona (Proposition 207, 60% Yes), Montana (Initiative 190, 57% Yes), South Dakota (Amendment A, 54% Yes), and New Jersey (Question 1, 67% Yes). Additionally, medical cannabis was legalized via ballot measures during the same election in Mississippi and South Dakota. South Dakota would have become the first state to legalize medical and recreational cannabis simultaneously, but Amendment A was overturned in court the following February; this marked the first time that a legalization ballot measure was overturned. Observers noted that cannabis legalization was approved in states with both conservative and liberal electorates, making it one of the few issues to gain broad bipartisan support in an otherwise highly divisive election.

Vermont, which had previously legalized marijuana possession and home growing, legalized retail marijuana sales in 2020.

Once all ballot measures took effect in 2021, a total of 14 states had legalized cannabis for recreational use.

Legislation and initiatives introduced in 2020

State

US Virgin Islands
Governor of the United States Virgin Islands Albert Bryan requested the territorial legislature to pass an amendment to the existing medical cannabis bill, allowing use by all adults, in order to shore up the government employees retirement system. The proposal included a $10 "day pass" for tourists.

Tribal
The Oglala Sioux Tribe approved a referendum to allow medical and non-medical cannabis at the Pine Ridge Reservation on March 10.

Federal
William M. (Mac) Thornberry National Defense Authorization Act for Fiscal Year 2021

Legislation introduced in 2019 and advanced in 2020

State
, legalization
Vermont S.54, authorizing taxed and regulated cannabis sales in the state that legalized possession in 2018, was approved by the Vermont Senate in 2019. It was approved by the House Committee on Government Operations on January 31, 2020, by the House Ways and Means on February 5, and by the Appropriations Committee on February 24, clearing its way for a full House vote. It was approved by the House on February 26. S.54 became law without the state governor's signature in October.

Federal
SAFE Banking Act (via 2020 HEROES Act coronavirus relief bill)

Initiatives and referendums qualified in 2019
The following was qualified by the initiative process in 2019 for the 2020 ballot.
South Dakota Initiated Measure 26

The following was approved by the state legislature in 2019 for the 2020 ballot.
New Jersey Cannabis Regulatory and Expungement Aid Modernization Act

2020 U.S. Presidential election
28 candidates challenging the United States President in the 2020 election declared positions on cannabis reform. None of them were for continuing prohibition, with positions including Federal legalization (22 candidates, including Republican challenger William Weld), states' choice (five candidates), and Federal decriminalization (one candidate). Legalization was among the executive orders drafted by candidate Bernie Sanders for his first 100 days in office, and candidate Elizabeth Warren promised executive action to deschedule marijuana if Congress did not do so by passing the Marijuana Opportunity Reinvestment and Expungement (MORE) Act. Presumptive Democratic candidate Joe Biden reaffirmed his pursuit of national decriminalization in a "Plan for Black America" announced in May.

References

Further reading

External links
Marijuana on the ballot at Ballotpedia

Cannabis reform proposals 2020
Cannabis reform 2020

2020 United States
Reform proposals 2020